Tashmoo Hill is a hill in Dukes County, Massachusetts. It is located on Martha's Vineyard southwest of Vineyard Haven in the Town of Tisbury. Pilot Hill is located west-northwest of Tashmoo Hill.

References

Mountains of Massachusetts
Mountains of Dukes County, Massachusetts